The 2012 Columbus Lions season was the sixth season for the professional indoor football franchise and their first in the Professional Indoor Football League (PIFL).

The team played their home games under head coach Jason Gibson at the Columbus Civic Center in Columbus, Georgia.

Schedule
Key:

Preseason

Regular season

Postseason

Roster

Division standings

References

External links
2012 results

Columbus Lions
Columbus Lions
Columbus Lions